Marc Parent is the former Director of Police of the City of Montreal Police Service. He was appointed on September 13, 2010, as the 35th Director. Prior to becoming the Director of Police, he was Assistant Director of Police. He left office in 2015 and was succeeded by Philippe Pichet.

Parent earned a BA in business administration from Université du Québec à Montreal and an MA in
Public Administration from École nationale d'administration publique.  Parent also has a degree from the FBI National Academy – University of Virginia.

Parent succeeded Yvan Delorme.

References 

Montreal police chiefs
Université du Québec à Montréal alumni
University of Virginia alumni
Living people
Year of birth missing (living people)
Université du Québec alumni